Narahari Tirtha ( 1243 -   1333) was a Dvaita philosopher, scholar, statesman and one of the disciples of Madhvacharya. He is considered to be the progenitor of the Haridasa movement along with Sripadaraja. Though only two of his scholarly works are extant, they are characterised by their verbosity and lack of digressions. A few songs of his survive under the pen name Raghukulatilaka. As a minister of considerable influence to the Eastern Ganga rulers and later as the pontiff of Madhvacharya mutt, Narahari converted the Simhachalam temple into an educational establishment of renown and a religious centre for Vaishnavism.

Life
Nothing is known about his early life except that he served as a minister in the Eastern Ganga Kingdom in Kalinga (modern day Odisha) and later as a regent in the stead of Narasimha Deva II before his ordination as a monk. Information about his life is derived from a hagiography called Narahariyatistotra, Narayana Pandita's Madhva Vijaya and inscriptions from the Srikurmam and Simhachalam temples, all of which attest to his regency. The inscriptions also allude to his expertise in scriptures and swordsmanship. Sharma conjectures from the presence and contents of the inscriptions that post 1281 C.E., he was "the virtual overlord of the country". At the height of his power, he built the Yogananda Narasimha Temple in Srikurmam and defended the city from attacks of vandals.  There is also evidence that he was patronised by Bhanudeva I and his ward Narasimha Deva II and also that he disseminated the philosophy of Madhva throughout Kalinga. His mortal remains rest at Charkratirtha near Hampi.

Works and legacy
Narahari's treatise on the Gita Bhashya of Madhva called Bhavaprakashika is considered to be an important work in the Dvaita canon, being referenced by Jayatirtha and Raghavendra Tirtha. Sharma notes that Narahari expands upon the obscure passages in the source text and directs polemical barbs against the commentaries by Sankara and Ramanuja. Though presumably not of Kannada origin, many of his works were in that language although only three of his compositions in Kannada survive. Narahari and Sripadaraja are considered to be the forerunners of the Haridasa movement by penning songs and hymns, mostly containing the teachings of Madhva in simplified terms and set to music in the vernacular Kannada language. Traditionally, Narahari is also considered to be the founder of Yakshagana and Bayalaata, a dance form which still flourishes in parts of Karnataka and Kasargod in present-day Kerala.

Notes 
1. The songs are yanthu marulade nanenthu and hariye idu sariye.

References

Bibliography

External links
 Biography of Narahari Tirtha

History of Karnataka
Kannada literature
Dvaitin philosophers
Dvaita Vedanta
Uttaradi Math
13th-century Indian people
Madhva religious leaders
People from Odisha